Ageneiosus inermis is a species of driftwood catfish of the family Auchenipteridae. It can be found throughout South America, from Colombia and Venezuela to Uruguay and northern Argentina.

The name Ageneiosus marmoratus has been recently synonymized with A. inermis. The description was based on a strongly pigmented juvenile of A. inermis.

References

Further reading
Eschmeyer, William N., ed. 1998. Catalog of Fishes. Special Publication of the Center for Biodiversity Research and Information, num. 1, vol. 1–3. California Academy of Sciences. San Francisco, California, United States. 2905. .

Ageneiosus
Fish described in 1766
Fish of Uruguay
Taxa named by Carl Linnaeus